Montefano is a comune (municipality) in the Province of Macerata in the Italian region Marche, located about  southwest of Ancona and about  north of Macerata.

Montefano borders the following municipalities: Appignano, Filottrano, Montecassiano, Osimo, Recanati.

Sights
Churches in Montefano include: 
Collegiata di San Donato, Baroque style 
Santa Maria Assunta
San Filippo Benizi, also in Baroque style.

People
 Marcello Cervini degli Spannochi, Pope Marcellus II, was born in Montefano.

References

External links
 Official website

Cities and towns in the Marche